Sawran may refer to:
 Sawran (Kazakhstan)
 Sawran, Syria

See also 
 Savran (disambiguation)